Yasmin Ayesha Christopher Trudeau (born 1983 or 1984) is an American lawyer and politician serving as a member of the Washington State Senate, representing the 27th district since 2021. A member of the Democratic Party, she was appointed to the Senate by the Pierce County Council in November 2021 to fill a vacancy created by the resignation of Senator Jeannie Darneille voted in on Aug 2, 2022 officially after her appointment.

References

1980s births
Living people
Women state legislators in Washington (state)
21st-century American politicians
21st-century American women politicians
Democratic Party Washington (state) state senators